Lieutenant General Sir Charles Toler MacMorrough Kavanagh,  (25 March 1864 – 11 October 1950) was a British Army officer who commanded the Cavalry Corps during the First World War, most notably at the Battle of Amiens in 1918.

Military career

Born the son of Arthur MacMorrough Kavanagh, The MacMorrough and Mary Frances Forde-Leathley and educated at Harrow School and the Royal Military College, Sandhurst, Kavanagh was commissioned into the 3rd Dragoon Guards in February 1884 and transferred to the 10th Royal Hussars two weeks later. He was promoted to captain on 29 April 1891.

On 12 June 1895 he was appointed adjutant to the 6th Yeomanry Brigade (Prince Albert's Own Leicestershire Yeomanry Cavalry and Derbyshire Yeomanry Cavalry); this posting ended on 16 February 1903. He served in the Second Boer War as Commanding Officer of the 10th Royal Hussars, and was promoted to major on 6 January 1900, and to brevet lieutenant-colonel on 29 November 1900. Following the end of the war in May 1902, Kavanagh returned to the United Kingdom in the SS Dunottar Castle, which arrived at Southampton in July 1902. He was mentioned in despatches by Lord Kitchener in his final despatch dated 23 June 1902, and received the Distinguished Service Order (DSO) for his service in the war.

After his return, he went on to be commander of the 1st Cavalry Brigade at Aldershot Command in 1909. He fought in the Great War as commander of the 7th Cavalry Brigade (part of the British Expeditionary Force) from 1914, as General Officer Commanding 2nd Cavalry Division from April 1915 and as General Officer Commanding 5th Division from July 1915. After that he served as commander of the Cavalry Corps from 1917 leading the corps to success at the Battle of Amiens and remaining in post until the end of the War. He retired in 1920.

In retirement he became Governor of the Military Knights of Windsor.

Family
In 1895 he married Mary Perry; they had two daughters.

References

External links

1864 births
1950 deaths
British Army personnel of the Second Boer War
British Army lieutenant generals
British Army cavalry generals of World War I
British people of Irish descent
Graduates of the Royal Military College, Sandhurst
People educated at Harrow School
Knights Commander of the Order of the Bath
Knights Commander of the Order of St Michael and St George
Commanders of the Royal Victorian Order
Companions of the Distinguished Service Order
3rd Dragoon Guards officers
10th Royal Hussars officers
Military personnel from County Carlow
People from County Carlow